Psathyrella vinosofulva is a species of agaric fungus in the family Psathyrellaceae. The species, first described scientifically by P.D.Orton in 1960, is found in Europe. The cap is initially conical to convex before expanded slightly, becoming slightly umbonate, and measures  in diameter. The spores are ellipsoid, have a germ pore, and dimensions of 11–13 by 5.75–7 μm.

See also
List of Psathyrella species

References

External links

Psathyrellaceae
Fungi described in 1960
Fungi of Europe